Max Payne is a 2001 third-person shooter video game developed by Remedy Entertainment and published by Gathering of Developers. The game centers on former NYPD detective Max Payne, who attempts to solve the murder of his family while investigating a drug trafficking case involving a mysterious new designer drug called "Valkyr". While doing so, Max becomes entangled in a large and complex conspiracy, involving a major pharmaceutical company, organized crime, a secret society, and the U.S. military. The game features a gritty neo-noir style and uses graphic novel panels (with voice-overs) as the primary means of telling the game's story, drawing inspiration from hard-boiled detective novels by authors like Mickey Spillane. The game contains many allusions to Norse mythology, particularly the myth of Ragnarök, and several of the names used in the game are allusions to Norse mythology. The gameplay is heavily influenced by the Hong Kong action cinema genre, particularly the work of director John Woo, and it was one of the first games to feature the bullet-time effect popularized by The Matrix.

Max Payne was originally released for Microsoft Windows in July 2001, and was later ported by Rockstar Games to the PlayStation 2 and Xbox in December 2001, and by MacSoft and Feral Interactive to the Mac OS in July 2002. A version of the game for the Game Boy Advance, featuring an isometric perspective but retaining most of the original's gameplay elements, was released by Rockstar in December 2003, and an enhanced port for mobile devices was published in 2012 to coincide with the release of Rockstar's Max Payne 3. A Dreamcast version of the game was also planned, but was canceled due to the discontinuation of the console in 2001. Max Payne was also made available on Xbox 360 as part of Xbox Originals program in 2009, on PlayStation 3 as a PS2 Classic in 2012, on PlayStation 4 in 2016, and on Xbox One and Xbox Series X/S in 2021, due to the consoles' respective backward compatibility and emulation features.

The original release of Max Payne received highly positive reviews for its exciting gunplay and use of noir storytelling devices, and has been cited as one of the best video games ever made. The game won a large number of accolades, including a BAFTA Award for Best PC Game of 2001. Its success launched the Max Payne franchise, including the sequels Max Payne 2: The Fall of Max Payne, developed again by Remedy and published by Rockstar in October 2003, and Max Payne 3, developed solely by Rockstar and released in May 2012. A loose film adaptation of the first game was released in October 2008. In 2022, it was announced that Remedy and Rockstar are developing a remake of Max Payne and its first sequel for PlayStation 5, Windows, and Xbox Series X/S.

Gameplay
The player assumes the role of the titular character, with gameplay revolving around the use of the bullet time mechanic during firefights – when triggered, time is slowed down to such an extent that the speed at which bullets and other projectiles move is slow enough to be seen by the naked eye. Although Max's movement is also slowed, the player is still able to move and react in real-time, allowing them more time to plan and react to enemies.

Players are initially armed with a 9mm Beretta pistol, but as the game progresses, other weapons become available, with Max able to dual-wield some weapons for an increase in firepower at the cost of higher ammo consumption. When hurt, Max can replenish health by taking painkillers, which can be found in medical cabinets, lying around in levels, or taken from slain enemies.

The game's AI is dependent on scripted commands: most of the behavior exhibited by enemies (such as taking cover, retreating from the player, or throwing grenades) is scripted.

Progression through the levels is linear, occasionally incorporating small platforming and puzzle-solving elements. The game's storyline is often advanced in-game by the player following Max's internal monologue as the character determines what his next steps should be, breaking between – and sometimes within – levels in order to deliver larger story beats via graphic novel-styled interludes.

In addition to the standard game difficulty, "Fugitive", the game also features "Hard-Boiled", which increases damage taken while limiting health and ammo supplies; "Dead on Arrival", which limits the player to only seven saves per chapter; and "New York Minute", which forces the player to complete each chapter within an allotted time. Upon completing the game on "Dead on Arrival", the player unlocks "The Last Challenge" (also known as "End Combat" or "Final Battle" in other releases), which gives the player a select amount of painkillers, weapons, and ammunition, and puts them in a firefight with perpetual bullet time against the "Killer Suit" hitmen seen during the later parts of the game's campaign.

Plot

Max Payne (James McCaffrey) is a former NYPD officer-turned-DEA agent whose wife Michelle (Haviland Morris) and newborn daughter Rose were murdered by armed junkies that were high on a new designer drug called Valkyr. In 2001, three years after their deaths, Max works undercover within the Punchinello Mafia family, who control the trafficking of Valkyr. His DEA colleague, B.B. (Adam Grupper), arranges a meeting between Max and his friend and former colleague, Alex Balder (Chris Phillips), in a subway station. While waiting for Alex, Max accidentally gets in a shootout with mobsters working for Punchinello underboss Jack Lupino (Jeff Gurner), who are staging a bank robbery through an abandoned part of the subway. When Alex arrives, he is killed by an unseen assassin, who frames Max for the murder.

Hunted by both the police and his former mob associates, who now know he is a cop, Max searches for Vinnie Gognitti (Joe Dallo), Lupino's right-hand man, in the hopes that he will lead him to Lupino. Along the way, he breaks up a Valkyr drug deal and discovers that Russian mobster Vladimir Lem (Dominic Hawksley) has started a war with the Punchinello family. After catching Gognitti, Max interrogates him and learns Lupino is at his nightclub, the RagnaRock. Max kills Lupino before running into Mona Sax (Julia Murney), a contract assassin and the sister-in-law of Don Angelo Punchinello (Joe Ragno). Mona, seeking revenge against Punchinello for abusing her sister and not wanting Max to get in her way, gives him a drink laced with Valkyr. While experiencing a nightmare of the night his family was killed, Max is found by mobsters and taken away to be tortured, but manages to escape.

Max strikes a partnership with Lem, who gives him a tip about a cargo ship at the Brooklyn waterfront carrying high-powered firearms, which some of Lem's former henchmen intend to sell to Punchinello. After securing the weapons, Max attempts to lure the Don into a trap at his restaurant, only to be ambushed himself. After escaping, Max storms Punchinello's manor and confronts the Don, but discovers that he is only a puppet in a bigger conspiracy. The manor is then overrun by mercenaries who kill Punchinello and leave Max for dead after injecting him with a Valkyr overdose.

After another drug-induced nightmare, Max heads to an old steel foundry where the mercenaries are regrouping. There, he finds a hidden underground military research complex, and discovers that Valkyr is the result of the "Valhalla Project", a Gulf War-era military experiment to improve soldiers' stamina and morale through chemical enhancements. The project was halted after a few years due to poor results, but was later secretly restarted by Nicole Horne (Jane Gennaro) through her pharmaceutical company, Aesir. When Michelle accidentally found out about Aesir's illegal experiments, Horne ordered her and her family's death. Max escapes from the bunker after Aesir initiates a self-destruct protocol to get rid of the evidence and witnesses, including their own men.

Later, Max, having figured out that B.B. is on Horne's payroll and framed him for Alex's murder, agrees to meet him at a parking lot complex, where he kills him and his men. He is then called to meet a secret society called the Inner Circle, who have been observing him. Their leader, Alfred Woden (John Randolph Jones), reveals that Horne was once a member, and asks Max to kill her in exchange for dealing with the charges against him. The meeting is ambushed by Horne's men, but both Max and Woden escape. Max arrives at Aesir's headquarters and fights his way to the top. Along the way, he runs into Mona again, who has been hired by Horne to kill him; she refuses to do so and is seemingly killed for it, but her body vanishes. As Horne attempts to flee in her helicopter, Max severs the guy wires of the building's antenna, causing it to crash into the helicopter and kill Horne. As the NYPD storms the building, Max, his vendetta finally complete, surrenders and is taken into custody. Outside, he notices Woden among the crowd formed at the scene, and smiles, knowing that Woden will ensure his protection.

Characters 
Max Payne

Max Payne (voiced by James McCaffrey) is a fugitive DEA agent and former NYPD detective whose wife Michelle and newborn daughter were killed in connection with the Valkyr drug case. Max then goes undercover in the mob and eventually becomes a one-man-army vigilante, waging a personal war on crime. Max ends up killing hundreds of gangsters and conspiracy enforcers while on the run from the police determined to stop his vendetta against all those responsible for his family's death. He uses metaphors and wordplay to describe the world around him within his inner monologues, which often contradict his external responses to characters he speaks with. The game presents the story as retold by Max from his point of view.

Mona Sax

Mona Sax (voiced by Julia Murney): The twin sister of Lisa Punchinello and a contract killer, Mona is the femme fatale of the game. She has a grudge against her sister Lisa's abusive husband, Mafia boss Angelo Punchinello, whom she desires to kill. After Punchinello is killed, she sides with Nicole Horne, who hires her to kill Max. Finding herself unable to do so, she is shot in the head by one of Horne's henchmen and collapses inside an elevator, though it is implied that she survived, as her body is gone when the elevator's doors reopen.

Development
Remedy Entertainment developed an idea of a "third-person action game" in late 1996, after completing Death Rally (their first game), inspired first by Loaded and then by the success of Tomb Raider (although determined to avoid its "horrid camera system"). According to the game's story and scriptwriter Sam Lake, for him "the starting point was this archetype of the private eye, the hard-boiled cop" that would be used in a game with a "deeper, more psychological" story. A game prototype and design document of the project, with the working titles Dark Justice and Max Heat (a wordplay on this is a TV show called Dick Justice and a porn film Max Heat, both featured in Max Payne 2), were soon created and shown to 3D Realms, who signed a development deal and production began. In 1999, the designers traveled from Finland to New York to research the city, accompanied by two ex-NYPD bodyguards, to get ideas for environments and take thousands of photographs for mapping.

For cutscenes, the developers found comic panels (with voice-overs) to be more effective and less costly to use than fully animated cinematics, noting that comic panels forced the player to interpret each panel for themselves and "the nuances are there in the head of the reader [...] it would be much harder to reach that level with in-game or even pre-rendered cinematics". They also found it easier to reorganize the comic panels if the plot needed to be changed while developing the game. The in-game engine is used for some cutscenes involving action sequences. The music for the game was composed by Kärtsy Hatakka.

Remedy used their game engine, which they dubbed MaxFX (or MAX-FX, in development since early 1997). The only games that used this engine were Max Payne and its sequel, while a MaxFX level editor was also included in the release. MAX-FX was licensed to Futuremark, who used it for their 3DMark benchmark series with the last one being 3DMark 2001 Second Edition.

The first trailer showcasing an early version of the game's story and gameplay was shown at the 1998 E3, attracting considerable interest due to its innovative content and effects (especially the MaxFX's 3D particle-based system for smoke and muzzle flashes), although 3D Realms producers later claimed they deliberately avoided overhyping the game. Max Payne was initially scheduled to be released in the summer of 1999; however, it was repeatedly delayed and got heavily revamped in 2000. In particular, the game's graphics were improved to feature much more realistic textures and lighting, while the multiplayer mode was dropped. The game was eventually released for Windows on 23 July 2001.

As a result of the inevitable comparisons to The Matrix, the designers have included several homages to the film in order to capitalize on the hype: for instance, the detonation of the subway tunnel door to gain access to the bank vault is similar to the cartwheeling elevator door in the movie, while the introduction "Nothing to Lose" level is similar to the lobby shootout scene in the film. Futuremark, which licensed the MAX-FX graphics for their 3DMark benchmark series, included a Matrix-like lobby shootout as a game test in the 2001 edition.

Game Boy Advance version
The GBA version of the game was developed in 2003 by Möbius Entertainment (later Rockstar Leeds). Since it was developed on a far less powerful platform, this version differs significantly from the PC versions and its Xbox and PlayStation 2 ports: instead of a 3D shooter, the game is based on sprite graphics and is shown from an isometric perspective. However, the other gameplay features have remained very similar to the original, including the use of polygonal graphics for the characters. The story also remained the same as in the PC and console versions, though some levels from the original are omitted, and the game still features many of the original's graphic novel sections, complete with some of the voice-overs. The music was composed by Tom Kingsley.

Max Payne Mobile
On 6 April 2012, Max Payne was announced for Android and iOS, titled Max Payne Mobile,  a port of the PC version of the original Max Payne. The game was released for iOS on 13 April 2012, while the Android version was delayed until 14 June 2012. No major changes were made to the game apart from the HD overhaul. A new version 1.3 was released on 18 March 2013 that fixes a bug that prevents users from accessing their cloud saves.

Reception and awards

Sales
In its debut month, sales of Max Payne reached roughly 82,000 copies. It became the United States' 19th-best-selling computer game of 2001, with domestic sales of 300,782 units and revenues of $13.8 million.

In the United States, Max Paynes computer and PlayStation 2 versions respectively sold 430,000 copies ($16.9 million in revenue) and 1.6 million copies ($56 million in revenue) by 2006. According to Edge and Next Generation, this made Max Payne the country's 33rd-highest-selling computer game released between 2000 and 2006, and the 26th-highest-selling game launched for the PlayStation 2, Xbox or GameCube between those dates.

The Entertainment and Leisure Software Publishers Association (ELSPA) awarded Max Paynes computer version a "Silver" sales award, and its PlayStation 2 version a "Gold" award, indicating respective sales of at least 100,000 and 200,000 copies in the United Kingdom. The game ultimately totaled four million sales.

Critical reviews

Max Payne was released to very positive reviews. AllGame praised the game's atmosphere, level and sound design while noting that the "story is, at times, predictable and full of clichés" and that "Unlike Half-Life, where the action is integrated perfectly with its simplistic, yet appropriate story, Max Payne frequently yanks you out of the game and forces you to look at a badly-drawn in-game 'graphic novel' and listen to mediocre dialogue." The review also noted a lack of replay value or multiplayer modes. In a mixed review, Edge praised Max Payne for successfully integrating the bullet time mechanic into its core but criticized its linear and shallow level design. While the graphics were generally praised for high-resolution textures, the character models lacked animated facial expressions (IGN criticized the titular character's "grimace on his face that makes him look constipated").

The game won many annual awards for the year 2001, including Best PC Game by the British Academy of Film and Television Arts; Golden Joystick Award by Dennis Publishing; Visitors Award Best PC Game at the European Computer Trade Show; Best Game of 2001, Best Graphics in a PC Game, and Best PC Action Game by The Electric Playground; Readers Choice Best Game and Best PC Game by Pelit; Computer Game of the Year by The Augusta Chronicle; Best PC Game of 2001 by Amazon.com; PC Game of the Year by Shacknews and by GameZone; The Best of 2001 - PC and Editor's Choice by Game Revolution; Reader's Choice Game, Best Single Player Action Game, and Best Xbox Game by GameSpot; Readers' Choice Game of the Year, Best Storyline, Best Graphics and Best Use of Sound, and Best Adventure Game (Xbox) and Editor's Choice by IGN; Gamers Choice Award (Xbox) by Games Domain; Best Gimmick by GameSpy (runner-up in the Best Ingame Cinematics and Best Movie Trailer categories); and Editor's Choice and Best Innovation Destined for Overuse by Computer Gaming World. The staff of IGN wrote: "This game garnered so many votes from the readers that we almost decided to create a new Best Max Payne Game of 2001 category." The site also called it the 96th best PlayStation 2 game. They claimed that gamers thought of Max Payne instead of The Matrix when they thought of bullet time. PC Gamer US presented Max Payne with its 2001 "Best Action Game" and "Best Graphics" awards and the editors summarized the game as "spine-chilling, exhilarating, and surreal". GameSpot named Max Paynes Xbox version the sixth-best console game of 2001. It was a runner-up in the publication's annual "Best Xbox Game" and, among console games, "Best Story" and "Best Shooting Game" award categories.

The PlayStation 2 version suffered from reduced detail and occasional slowdowns, as the game stressed the limits of the console's power. Also, the levels were broken up into smaller parts so it would not tax the PlayStation 2's 32 MB of RAM, which according to IGN caused "heavy disruption to the flow and tension of the story". Otherwise, it was a faithful port that retained all of the content from the PC original. GameSpot awarded it an 8.0/10, (compared to the 9.2 ratings awarded to the PC and Xbox versions), saying "If you can't play this intense, original action game on any platform except the PS2, then that's where you should play it--but only by default."

Jeff Lundrigan reviewed the PC version of the game for Next Generation, rating it four stars out of five, and stated that "Max Payne is not perfect. On the other hand, we can think of few games, ever, that were such a blast to play, so neatly captured the essence of what they set out to simulate, or were just so over-the-top cool."

An early version of Max Payne was also a runner-up for the Best of Show award at E3 in 1998. The finished game received several Game of the Month-type awards in various video game outlets (and a Seal of Excellence at Adrenaline Vault) and was included in the 2005 list of 50 best games of all time, as well as in the 2011 list of 100 top PC games of all time. In 2007, bit-tech included the game and its sequel on the list of the top five most moddable games. It received two awards from Eurogamer, Best Game Cinematography Award and Best Game Character Award of 2001.

Max Payne Mobile received mixed to positive reviews. Some praised the HD graphics overhaul, although pointed out the game's age and the issues with the touchscreen controls.

Legacy

A sequel, Max Payne 2: The Fall of Max Payne, was released in 2003. The third game, Max Payne 3, was developed by Rockstar Games and released in 2012. Max Payne, a film loosely based on the video game, was released in 2008, starring Mark Wahlberg as Max Payne and Mila Kunis as Mona Sax. In April 2022, Remedy announced that it is remaking Max Payne and Max Payne 2 with funding from Rockstar, using Remedy's Northlight game engine, to be released as a compilation for PlayStation 5, Windows, and Xbox Series X/S.

Notes

References

External links

 
 Max Payne archives at 3D Realms
 
 

2001 video games
3D Realms games
Android (operating system) games
BAFTA Interactive Entertainment Award for Best Games winners
Cancelled Dreamcast games
Detective video games
Drug Enforcement Administration in fiction
Feral Interactive games
Fictional portrayals of the New York City Police Department
Game Boy Advance games
Gathering of Developers games
Grove Street Games games
IOS games
MacOS games
MacSoft games
Max Payne
Neo-noir video games
Organized crime video games
PlayStation 2 games
PlayStation Network games
Remedy Entertainment games
Rockstar Games games
Rockstar Vienna games
Single-player video games
Take-Two Interactive games
Third-person shooters
Video games about police officers
Video games about revenge
Video games about the illegal drug trade
Video games adapted into films
Video games based on Norse mythology
Video games developed in Finland
Video games scored by Kärtsy Hatakka
Video games set in 1998
Video games set in 2001
Video games set in New Jersey
Video games set in New York City
Video games with isometric graphics
Video games with time manipulation
Video games written by Sam Lake
Westlake Interactive games
Windows games
Xbox games
Xbox Originals games